Vijaya Manikya I (d. 1488) was the Maharaja of Tripura briefly during the late 15th century.

A minor when he ascended the throne, Vijaya succeeded upon the assassination of his predecessor Pratap Manikya, who may have been his father. His reign is omitted from the Rajmala, the royal chronicle of Tripura, though a copper plate produced in 1488 which is inscribed with his name provides a timeframe for his rule. It is also believed that the Rajmala confused Vijaya with his more famous relative of the same name, Vijaya Manikya II, conflicting some details of his life with the latter.

He appears to have spent his reign under the control of his maternal uncle, the army chief Daityanarayan, who was the true power in the kingdom. The latter also had his daughter married to the young king.
However, Vijaya seems to have only held the throne briefly and died young, with the coinage minted the following year bearing the name of Pratap's younger brother Mukut Manikya.

References

Kings of Tripura
History of Tripura